Senior Pageants Group is a glamour lifestyle company that manages and promotes various beauty pageants for women aged 50 to 90+ in the United States.  The organization is headquartered in New York, New York. As of 2022, the pageants are broken down to six categories; Ms. Senior United States is a contest open to women aged For ages 50–59, Ms. Senior USA open to women ages 60–74, Ms. Super Senior USA open to women ages 75–89, and Grande Dame Universe  for women aged 90+.

The organization also has active pageants for Ms. Senior Universe for those aged 55–74 with a country of origin and another national pageant title, and Ms. Super Senior Universe for those aged 75+ and Ms. Senior Universe standard.

Future pageants
The 2023 finals for the MS. Senior Universe, MS. Super Senior Universe, and MS. Grande Dame Universe pageants will be held in Orlando, Florida.

Awards 
 Ms. Senior United States
 Ms. Senior USA
 Ms. Super Senior USA
 Ms. Senior Universe
 Ms. Super Senior Universe
 Ms. Grand Dame Universe

The various categories focus on the competitors’ ability to show their accomplishments and how the contestants portray themselves. There is no bathing suit competition, only an evening gown segment. During the pageants, candidates are judged on integrity, talent, philosophy of life, poise in formal wear, and answering interview questions.

Winners

References

External links 
 Official website

American awards
America
2015 establishments in the United States